Ayoze Díaz Díaz (born 25 May 1982), known simply as Ayoze, is a Spanish former footballer who played as a left back.

Club career

Tenerife and Racing
 
Born in San Cristóbal de La Laguna, Canary Islands, and brought through the ranks of local CD Tenerife, Ayoze made his debut with the first team in 1999–2000. In the summer of 2003, after just one full season in the second division, he joined La Liga club Racing de Santander, where he was relatively used as a defender or midfielder in his first three years (with a loan to soon-to-be-extinct Ciudad de Murcia in between).

During the 2007–08 campaign, as the Cantabria side achieved a first-ever qualification to the UEFA Cup, Ayoze became first choice, relegating historical and veteran Luis Fernández to the bench.

Mallorca
Ayoze signed a three-year contract with RCD Mallorca in July 2008, replacing Sevilla FC-bound Fernando Navarro. During his first year he started as backup to another newly signed, Enrique Corrales, but finished in the starting XI.

In the 2009–10 season, as Mallorca finished in fifth position and qualified for the Europa League, Ayoze completely won the battle for first-choice status over Corrales, appearing in 33 matches.

References

External links

1982 births
Living people
People from San Cristóbal de La Laguna
Sportspeople from the Province of Santa Cruz de Tenerife
Spanish footballers
Footballers from the Canary Islands
Association football defenders
La Liga players
Segunda División players
Segunda División B players
Tercera División players
CD Tenerife B players
CD Tenerife players
Racing de Santander players
Ciudad de Murcia footballers
RCD Mallorca players
Deportivo de La Coruña players